Chémeré-le-Roi is a commune in the Mayenne department in north-western France.

See also

Communes of the Mayenne department

References

Chemereleroi